25th Street may refer to:

 25th Street (Manhattan)
 25th Street (BMT Fifth Avenue Line), a defunct New York City Subway station
 25th Street (BMT Fourth Avenue Line), a local station on the BMT Fourth Avenue Line of the New York City Subway
 Historic 25th Street, a historic district located in Ogden, Utah, US

See also
 25th Street station (disambiguation)